Deeringia mirabilis is a plant species published in 2005. It is in the family Amaranthaceae and is endemic to Madagascar. It has only been documented Isalo National Park and Zombitse-Vohibasia National Park. Dendroportulaca mirabilis Eggli is a synonym.

References

Amaranthaceae
Endemic flora of Madagascar